The Empire Strikes Start!! is the debut studio album from Japanese girl group Empire. It was released on April 11, 2018, by Avex. The album consists of eleven tracks. The song "Black to the dreamlight" was used as the third closing theme for the anime Black Clover.

Track listing

Charts

References

2018 debut albums
Empire (Japanese band) albums
Japanese-language albums